Leota may refer to:

Places
Leota, Indiana
Leota, Michigan
Leota, Missouri
Leota Township, Nobles County, Minnesota

People
Trevor Leota (born 1975), former Samoan rugby player